Saint-Souplet is a commune in the Nord department in northern France.

Geography

Saint Souplet-Escaufourt is on the (departmental) route 115. It is part of the Canton of Le Cateau-Cambrésis, 6 km from Cateau, 30 km south east of Cambrai and 86 km from Lille.

Located in the south of Cateau-Cambrésis and on the doorstep of Avesnois, Saint-Souplet is surrounded by the nature landscapes of Hainaut : grasslands bordered by 'bocage' hedges and vast expanses of cultivated fields. It extends along the Selle, a tributary river of the Scheldt, which arises in Aisne and winds some 50 kilomètres through Nord.

History

Saint-Souplet owes its name to its patron saint, Sulpitius the Pious, archbishop of Bourges in the 7th century.

In 1973, it absorbed Escaufourt, located previously in Aisne.

Heraldry

Demography

Escaufourt

The name Escaufourt comes from fours à chaux (chalk oven). in the 12th century, Escaufourt was in the parish of Honnechy. Before the merger with Saint-Souplet un 1973, Escaufourt was an enclave of Aisne within Nord.

Heraldry

See also
Communes of the Nord department

References

Saintsouplet